Kul Huni (also Romanized as Kūl Hūnī; also known as Tappeh-ye Kūlhownī) is a village in Hoseyniyeh Rural District, Alvar-e Garmsiri District, Andimeshk County, Khuzestan Province, Iran. At the 2006 census, its population was 27, in 5 families.

References 

Populated places in Andimeshk County